The National Scientific Library is a library in Tbilisi, Georgia. National Scientific Library is a biggest library in Georgia. Established in 1941, it initially served only the employees of the Georgian National Academy of Sciences. Presently library has three buildings: founded in 1941 former Central Library of Georgian Academy of Sciences, founded in 1965 Science and Technology Library and founded in 1961 Library-Museum of Ioseb Grishashvili.

References 

Libraries in Tbilisi
Library buildings completed in 1941
1941 establishments in Georgia (country)
Libraries established in 1941
Science and technology in Georgia (country)
Science libraries